Doughboys is an audio podcast that follows Mike Mitchell and Nick Wiger as they review chain restaurants, including fast food restaurants, fast casual restaurants, and sit-down restaurants. The podcast started in May 2015, and began offering bonus episodes for Patreon supporters in March 2017 under the name Doughboys Double. Doughboys joined the Headgum network in April 2018, after having previously been members of the Feral Audio network until its disbandment.

The podcast episodes feature a weekly guest, including notable people from the comedy world such as Scott Aukerman, Gillian Jacobs, Sarah Silverman, Ike Barinholtz, Kyle Mooney, Beck Bennett, Matt Besser, Rob Lowe, Haley Joel Osment, Heather Anne Campbell, Lauren Lapkus, Bill Oakley, Paul Scheer, Jason Mantzoukas, John Hodgman, Paul F. Tompkins, and D'Arcy Carden. Mitchell and Wiger have also performed live shows across the United States and in Canada.

, Doughboys is the 24th most popular podcast on Patreon and the 50th most popular Patreon page overall, with over 11,600 subscribers.

Format 
Each episode begins with an introduction by Wiger, who gives some background information about the restaurant chain they are reviewing that week. Together with a guest, the hosts then discuss their recent visit to the restaurant as well as chain restaurants in general. Following this conversation about the food and their experience, they rate the chain on a scale from 0 to 5 "forks". If a person wants to specify their rating, they can also use "tines" as a way to give out .25, .50, .75 scores. If a restaurant gets above a 4.0 fork rating from each person on the episode, they become part of the "Golden Plate Club". If the restaurant gets 5 forks from every person they are in the "Platinum Plate Club". However, a restaurant's place in these clubs is not final and a chain can lose this distinction if it is reviewed again and receives lower ratings.

In addition to reviewing a chain restaurant each episode, the podcast includes recurring segments such as "Snack or Wack", in which the hosts and their guests determine if a food is worth eating, or "Drank or Stank", in which the hosts and their guests taste a beverage to determine if it is worth drinking. At the end of each episode, the hosts and guests respond to a question submitted by a listener.

Reception
Doughboys has received recognition as both a comedy and a food podcast on best-of lists by Paste, Mashable, Uproxx, and Reader's Digest, among others. Paste named it the 12th best podcast of the 2010s.

Doughboys has also been covered extensively on Vulture and The A.V. Club. It appeared on Vultures year-end list "The Year in Comedy Podcasts" in 2016, 2017, 2018 and 2019, and has been featured in its weekly series "This Week in Comedy Podcasts" several times. Vulture also named Doughboys "the one food podcast to start with". The A.V. Club included the podcast in its year-end podcasts list in 2015 and 2016, and has recommended multiple episodes in its weekly podcast column "Podmass".

The podcast won "Best Food Podcast" at the 4th iHeartRadio Podcast Awards in 2022, and was previously nominated in the same category at the 2nd iHeartRadio Podcast Awards in 2020.

Episode list

2015

2016

2017

2018

2019

See also
List of food podcasts

References

External links
 

Audio podcasts
Comedy and humor podcasts
2015 podcast debuts
Headgum
Patreon creators
Food and drink podcasts